Pahetiya is a Gram panchayat in hajipur,  vaishali district, bihar.

Geography
This panchayat is located at

Nearest City/Town
Hajipur (Distance 9 km)

Nearest major road highway or river
National highway 77 (nearest highway)

compass

Villages in panchayat
There are  villages in this panchayat

References

Gram panchayats in Bihar
Villages in Vaishali district
Vaishali district
Hajipur